Lorenz Hubert Weinrich (born 20 August 1929) is a German historian.

Life 
Weinrich was born in Salzwedel, Altmark. He started studying history and classical philology at Freie Universität Berlin in 1948, and he earned his doctoral degree in 1954 with a study on Wala of Corbie. Afterwards he worked as a teacher at different schools in Berlin and, starting in 1957, also at the Freie Universität Berlin. In 1967/1968 he was visiting scholar for Medieval Latin at University of Chicago. He habilitated in 1971 at Freie Universität Berlin in history. In 1973 and 1974 he taught Gregorian chant and at liturgy chant at the Episcopal University for Church Music Berlin. In 1980 he lectured at Universität des Saarlandes in Saarbrücken. From 1987 to 1989 he was Dean of the faculty of history at Freie Universität Berlin.

In 1975 Weinrich was invested into the Order of the Holy Sepulchre. Since 1979 he has been Commander of the order. In 2013 he was appointed to commander of the Order of St. Sylvesters with star. 

Since 1977 Weinrich has been a member, and from 1979 and 1980 vice chair, and from 1980 to 1992 chair, of the board of the association Gesellschaft für Christlich-Jüdische Zusammenarbeit in Berlin (Association for Christian Jewish co-operation in Berlin). In 1986 he was elected as a board member of the Deutscher Koordinierungsrat der Gesellschaften für Christlich-Jüdische Zusammenarbeit and 1987 he was its chair. In this capacity he presented the Buber-Rosenzweig-Medal to Yehudi Menuhin in 1989 .

Weinrich conducted the Gregorian scholae of the Roman Catholic parish Mater Dolorosa in Lankwitz from 1952 to 2002. He was a member of the Pastoral council for decades and until 2007 he was member of the management board of the parish. In this capacity he was co-founder of the foundation Stiftung Mater Dolorosa Berlin-Lankwitz in 2006.

Publications (selection) 
Monographs
 Wala – Graf, Mönch und Rebell. Lübeck und Hamburg 1963 (Karolingische Studien Heft 386)
 Das ungarische Paulinerkloster Santo Stefano Rotondo in Rom (1404–1579). Berliner historische Studien. Band 12, Ordensstudien, Berlin, Duncker und Humblot 1998. .

Edits and translations
 together with Herbert Helbig: Urkunden und erzählende Quellen zur deutschen Ostsiedlung im Mittelalter. Darmstadt 1968.
 Quellen zur deutschen Verfassungs-, Wirtschafts- und Sozialgeschichte bis 1250 (= Ausgewählte Quellen zur deutschen Geschichte des Mittelalters. Band 32). Wissenschaftliche Buchgesellschaft, Darmstadt 1977, .
 Toleranz und Brüderlichkeit: 30 Jahre Gesellschaft für Christlich-Jüdische Zusammenarbeit in Berlin. Berlin, Gesellschaft für Christlich-Jüdische Zusammenarbeit 1979.
 Quellen zur Verfassungsgeschichte des Römisch-Deutschen Reiches im Spätmittelalter (1250–1500). Freiherr-vom-Stein-Gedächtnisausgabe 33, Darmstadt 1983, .
 Pfarrkirche und Gemeinde Mater Dolorosa Berlin-Lankwitz 1912–1987, Berlin 1987.
 together with Jürgen Miethke: Quellen zur Kirchenreform im Zeitalter der großen Konzilien des 15. Jahrhunderts. Erster Teil: Die Konzilien von Pisa (1409) und Konstanz (1414–1418). (Ausgewählte Quellen zur deutschen Geschichte des Mittelalters, Freiherr-vom-Stein-Gedächtnisausgabe 38a). Darmstadt 1995.
 Quellen zur Reichsreform im Spätmittelalter. Ausgewählte Quellen zur deutschen Geschichte des Mittelalters. Band 39. Wissenschaftliche Buchgesellschaft, Darmstadt 2001, .
 Heiligenleben zur deutsch-slawischen Geschichte. Adalbert von Prag und Otto von Bamberg. Ausgewählte Quellen zur deutschen Geschichte des Mittelalters. Band 23. Wissenschaftliche Buchgesellschaft, Darmstadt 2005, .

Papers
 Laurentius-Verehrung in Ottonischer Zeit. In: Jahrbuch für die Geschichte Mittel- und Ostdeutschlands, Band 21. 1972.
 Der Slawenaufstand von 983 in der Darstellung des Bischofs Thietmar von Merseburg. In: Dieter Berg, Hans-Werner Goetz (Hrsg.): Historiographia Mediaevalis. Studien zur Geschichtsschreibung und Quellenkunde des Mittelalters. Festschrift für Franz-Josef Schmale zum 65. Geburtstag. Wissenschaftliche Buchgesellschaft, Darmstadt 1988, S. 77–87.

References

External links 
 Lorenz Weinrich, Mater Dolorosa Berlin-Lankwitz

1929 births
Living people
People from Salzwedel
People from the Province of Saxony
German Roman Catholics
German medievalists
Academic staff of the Free University of Berlin